Intensional, related to intension, may refer to:

Intensional 

 in philosophy of language: not extensional. See also intensional definition versus extensional definition
 in philosophy of mind: an intensional state is a state which has a propositional content
 in mathematical logic: see intensional statement. See also extensionality, and also intensional definition versus extensional definition
 Intensional logic embraces the study of intensional languages: at least one of their functors is intensional. It can be contrasted to extensional logic
 Intensional fallacy, committed when one makes an illicit use of Leibniz's law in an argument
 See also: Musical form